Tillandsia excelsa is a species of flowering plant in the genus Tillandsia. It is native to Central America, Cuba, Jamaica, and the Dominican Republic.

References

Epiphytes
excelsa
Flora of the Caribbean
Flora of Central America
Plants described in 1864
Flora without expected TNC conservation status